Streptomyces griseoflavus is a bacterium species from the genus of Streptomyces which has been isolated from garden soil. Streptomyces griseoflavus produces bicozamycin, colabomycins A, colabomycins C, germacradienol and hormaomycin.

Further reading

See also 
 List of Streptomyces species

References

External links
Type strain of Streptomyces griseoflavus at BacDive -  the Bacterial Diversity Metadatabase

griseoflavus
Bacteria described in 1948